Lyclene distributa is a moth of the family Erebidae first described by Francis Walker in 1862. It is found in Borneo, Peninsular Malaysia and Sumatra.

References
Notes

Bibliography

Nudariina
Moths described in 1862
Moths of Asia